The 2012–13 Bowling Green Falcons men's basketball team  represented Bowling Green State University during the 2012–13 NCAA Division I men's basketball season. The Falcons, led by sixth year head coach Louis Orr, played their home games at the Stroh Center and were members of the East Division of the Mid-American Conference. They finished the season 13–19, 7–9 in MAC play to finish in a tie for fourth place in the East Division. They lost in the first round of the MAC tournament to Miami (OH).

Roster

Schedule

|-
!colspan=9| Exhibition

|-
!colspan=9| Regular season

|-
!colspan=9| 2013 MAC tournament

References

Bowling Green
Bowling Green Falcons men's basketball seasons